Viața Medicală (Medical Life) is a Romanian weekly medical magazine, which publishes medical news, commentaries, and peer-reviewed medical articles.

References

External links

1989 establishments in Romania
Magazines established in 1989
Medical magazines
Magazines published in Romania
Romanian-language magazines
Weekly magazines published in Romania